Orchis italica, the naked man orchid or the Italian orchid, is a species of orchid native to the Mediterranean Basin. It gets its common name from the lobed lip (labellum) of each flower which mimics the general shape of a naked man. In Italy, it is believed that the consumption of the plant is conducive to virility. It prefers partial shade and low nutrient soil, and flowers in April.

Distribution
Orchis italica is commonly found in large clusters in the Mediterranean region. It is native to southwestern Europe (Balearic Islands, Portugal, Sardinia, and Spain), southeastern Europe (Albania, Greece, Italy, Crete, Sicily, and countries of the former Yugoslavia), western Asia (Cyprus, the East Aegean Islands, Lebanon, Syria, Israel, Palestinian Territories and Turkey), and northern Africa (Algeria, Libya, Morocco, and Tunisia).

References

External links
 
 

italica
Flora of North Africa
Flora of Southeastern Europe
Flora of Southwestern Europe
Flora of Western Asia